David Charles Haywood (born 20 March 1945) is an English former first-class cricketer.

Haywood was born in March 1945 at Hucknall, Nottinghamshire. He was educated at Nottingham High School, before going up to Jesus College, Cambridge. While studying at Cambridge, he played first-class cricket for Cambridge University Cricket Club in 1968, making nine appearances. Playing as a middle order batsman in the Cambridge team, he scored 284 runs at an average of 18.93, making one half century score of 62. Haywood was also associated with Nottinghamshire, appearing for their second eleven on a handful of occasions between 1962 and 1967, but was unable to force his way into their first eleven. In addition to playing cricket at Cambridge, Haywood also played football for Cambridge University A.F.C., for which he gained a blue.

References

External links

1945 births
Living people
People from Hucknall
Cricketers from Nottinghamshire
People educated at Nottingham High School
Alumni of Jesus College, Cambridge
English cricketers
Cambridge University cricketers
Cambridge University A.F.C. players
Association footballers not categorized by position
Association football players not categorized by nationality